Viktor Kazakov may refer to:

 Viktor Kazakov (lieutenant) (1923–1995), Soviet lieutenant and Hero of the Soviet Union
  (1925–1995), Soviet soldier, full bearer of the Order of Glory
 Viktor Kazakov (politician) (born 1949), Russian politician